Reach Out is the fourth studio album by the Four Tops, issued on Motown Records in July 1967. The group's biggest-selling studio album, Reach Out includes six of the Four Tops' most successful singles including the US and UK #1 hit "Reach Out I'll Be There", "Standing in the Shadows of Love", "Bernadette" and "7-Rooms of Gloom". The album was the group's last with the songwriting team of Holland–Dozier–Holland and also features covers of contemporary pop hits selected by Berry Gordy, among them Tim Hardin's "If I Were a Carpenter", the Left Banke's "Walk Away Renée" and two songs originally recorded by the Monkees. The album reached number 11 on Billboard Top LPs chart and peaked at number 4 in the United Kingdom, where it was released in November after delays. In 2020, Reach Out was ranked number 429 in Rolling Stone magazine's "The 500 Greatest Albums of All Time" list.

Critical reception

Upon release, Record Mirror praised the album's "four fine 'A' sides and their versions of some of the best non-R&B tunes around" while Penny Valentine of Disc and Music Echo described "Walk Away Renée" as the album's "only outstanding track".

Among retrospective reviews, BBC Music's Daryl Easlea has described Reach Out as the Four Tops' greatest album, praising its cohesion and noting that it "can be seen as the high-water mark of the first decade of Motown". Easlea considered the album and The Four Tops Greatest Hits to contain "some of the most passionate, soulful music, exquisite playing and well-written melodies of all time". AllMusic's John Bush was critical of the album's cover songs, opining "though it's one of the best Four Tops records of the '60s, Reach Out still feels weighted down by a few vain attempts at adult pop crossover". Writing in Motown Encyclopedia, Graham Betts felt the album "reads like a greatest hits package" and considered Holland, Dozier and Holland to have "bowed out on a high".

Track listing
All tracks produced by Brian Holland and Lamont Dozier, except for "Wonderful Baby", produced by Smokey Robinson; and "What Else is There to Do (But Think About You)", produced by Clarence Paul.

Side one
"Reach Out I'll Be There" (Holland–Dozier–Holland)
"Walk Away Renée" (Michael Brown, Bob Calilli, Tony Sansone)
"7-Rooms of Gloom" (Holland-Dozier-Holland)
"If I Were a Carpenter" (Tim Hardin)
"Last Train to Clarksville" (Tommy Boyce, Bobby Hart)
"I'll Turn to Stone" (Holland-Dozier-Holland, R. Dean Taylor)

Side two
"I'm a Believer" (Neil Diamond)
"Standing in the Shadows of Love" (Holland-Dozier-Holland)
"Bernadette" (Holland-Dozier-Holland)
"Cherish" (Terry Kirkman)
"Wonderful Baby" (Smokey Robinson)
"What Else Is There to Do (But Think About You)" (Stevie Wonder, Clarence Paul, Morris Broadnax)

Personnel
Levi Stubbs - lead vocals
Abdul "Duke" Fakir, Renaldo "Obie" Benson, Lawrence Payton, The Andantes - backing vocals
The Funk Brothers - instrumentation
James Meese - cover artwork

References

1967 albums
Four Tops albums
Albums produced by Smokey Robinson
Albums produced by Clarence Paul
Albums produced by Brian Holland
Albums produced by Lamont Dozier
Albums recorded at Hitsville U.S.A.
Motown albums